Candy Ann Brown (also known as Candy Brown Houston) is an American dancer, choreographer and theatre, film and television actress.

Career
Brown is known for originating the role of June in the 1975 Bob Fosse-directed Broadway musical Chicago, and for such films, television series and stage productions as the original cast of A Chorus Line and Pippin, Zebrahead, Ali, Six Feet Under, Sister, Sister, Nash Bridges and NYPD Blue.

Brown also performed on the Broadway stage in Purlie with Cleavon Little and Sherman Hemsley and in the West Coast premiere of the play For Colored Girls Who Have Considered Suicide When the Rainbow Is Enuf.

Filmography

Film

Television

References

External links

African-American actresses
American film actresses
American female dancers
Dancers from California
American stage actresses
American television actresses
African-American choreographers
American choreographers
Living people
Actresses from California
People from San Rafael, California
People from Marin County, California
1958 births
21st-century African-American people
21st-century African-American women
20th-century African-American people
20th-century African-American women